Green Camp Township is one of the fifteen townships of Marion County, Ohio, United States.  The 2010 census found 1,179 people in the township, 374 of whom lived in the village of Green Camp.

Geography
Located in the southwestern part of the county, it borders the following townships:
Big Island Township - north
Marion Township - northeast
Pleasant Township - east
Prospect Township - southeast
Jackson Township, Union County - southwest
Bowling Green Township - west

The village of Green Camp is located in eastern Green Camp Township.

Name and history
It is the only Green Camp Township statewide.

Government
The township is governed by a three-member board of trustees, who are elected in November of odd-numbered years to a four-year term beginning on the following January 1. Two are elected in the year after the presidential election and one is elected in the year before it. There is also an elected township fiscal officer, who serves a four-year term beginning on April 1 of the year after the election, which is held in November of the year before the presidential election. Vacancies in the fiscal officership or on the board of trustees are filled by the remaining trustees.

References

External links
County website

Townships in Marion County, Ohio
Townships in Ohio